Tersk may refer to:
Tersk Stud, a horse breeding farm in Russia owned and operated by the Russian government
Tersk horse, a breed of horse developed at Tersk

See also
 Tersky (disambiguation)